Elections to Bolton Metropolitan Borough Council were held on 1 May 2008.  One third of the council was up for election and the council stayed under no overall control.

20 seats were contested with 9 being won by the Conservatives, 7 by the Labour Party and 4 by the Liberal Democrats.

Overall turnout was 35.03%.

After the election, the composition of the council was
Labour 27
Conservative 23
Liberal Democrat 9
Independent 1

Election result

Council Composition
Prior to the election the composition of the council was:

After the election the composition of the council was:

Ward results

Astley Bridge ward

Bradshaw ward

Breightmet ward

Bromley Cross ward

Crompton ward

Farnworth ward

Great Lever ward

Halliwell ward

Harper Green ward

Heaton and Lostock ward

Horwich and Blackrod ward

Horwich North East ward

Hulton ward

Kearsley ward

Little Lever and Darcy Lever ward

Rumworth ward
Conservative candidate for Rumworth, Zahid Raja, withdrew before the election.

Smithills ward

Tonge with the Haulgh ward

Weshoughton North and Chew Moor ward

Weshoughton South ward

Sources

Notes

References
 

2008
2008 English local elections
2000s in Greater Manchester